Barrhaven East Ward or Ward 24 (French: Quartier Barrhaven-Est) is a municipal ward in Ottawa, Ontario. It consists of the eastern half of the city's Barrhaven subdivision. The ward came into effect at the 2022 Ottawa municipal election. It will be represented on Ottawa City Council by Wilson Lo.

The ward consists of the neighbourhoods of Knollsbrook, Longfields, Davidson Heights, Havenlea, Chapman Mills and Heart's Desire. 

The ward was created in the 2020 ward boundary review from parts of Barrhaven Ward and Gloucester-South Nepean Ward.

Election results

|-
!rowspan="2" colspan="2"|Candidate
!colspan="2"|Popular vote
|-
! Votes
! %
|-
| style="background-color:#F5B341;" |
| style="text-align:left;"  | Dominik Janelle
| style="text-align:right;" |
| style="text-align:right;" |
|-
| style="background-color:#5f4ac1;" |
| style="text-align:left;"  | Kathleen Caught
| style="text-align:right;" |
| style="text-align:right;" |
|-
| style="background-color:#FFD966;" |
| style="text-align:left;"  | Wilson Lo
| style="text-align:right;" |
| style="text-align:right;" |
|-
| style="background-color:#49606E;" |
| style="text-align:left;"  | Patrick Brennan
| style="text-align:right;" |
| style="text-align:right;" |
|-
| style="background-color:#7BB5B2;" |
| style="text-align:left;"  | Richard Garrick
| style="text-align:right;" |
| style="text-align:right;" |
|-
| style="background-color:#0874a2;" |
| style="text-align:left;"  | Guy Boone
| style="text-align:right;" |
| style="text-align:right;" |
|-
| style="background-color:#f8ece4;" |
| style="text-align:left;"  | Atiq Qureshi
| style="text-align:right;" |
| style="text-align:right;" |
|-
| style="text-align:right;background-color:#FFFFFF;" colspan="2" |Total votes
| style="text-align:right;background-color:#FFFFFF;" |
|- 
| style="text-align:right;background-color:#FFFFFF;" colspan="2" |Registered voters
| style="text-align:right;background-color:#FFFFFF;" |
|- 
| style="text-align:left;" colspan="4" |Note: Candidate campaign colours are based on the prominent colour used in campaign items (signs, literature, etc.)and are used as a visual differentiation between candidates.
|- 
| style="text-align:left;" colspan="4" |Sources:
|}

References

Ottawa wards